Sweet potato yellow dwarf virus (SPYDV) is a plant pathogenic virus of the family Potyviridae.

External links
ICTVdB - The Universal Virus Database: Sweet potato yellow dwarf virus
Family Groups - The Baltimore Method

Viral plant pathogens and diseases
Ipomoviruses
Sweet potatoes